Michelotto is both an Italian surname and a masculine Italian given name. Notable people with the name include:

Claudio Michelotto (born 1942), Italian cyclist
Michelotto Corella (died 1508), Valencian condottiero

Italian-language surnames
Italian masculine given names